Sanmao is a manhua character created by Zhang Leping in 1935. He is one of the world's longest running cartoon characters and remains a landmark as one of the most famous and beloved fictional characters in China today.

The name Sanmao means "three hairs" in Chinese or "three mao" (a reference to his poverty). While the character has undergone a number of transitions over time, he has always been drawn with the trademark three strands of hair, which implies malnutrition as a result of poverty.

History

Most Chinese comic books prior to Sanmao featured adults and the Sanmao stories were also unusual in that they lacked dialogue and could therefore be classified as pantomime comics. When Zhang Leping created the manhua comic series, his main goal was to dramatize the confusion brought about to society by the Second Sino-Japanese War. He wanted to express his concern for the young victims of the war, particularly the orphans living on the streets. Most of the changes in the characters would come after World War II during the liberation in 1949.

Sanmao's image has evolved throughout time and in some modern continuation of the comics, he is depicted as a healthy, normal student. The character has also been portrayed as living through some of the most important periods in Chinese history and during futuristic space explorations.

Story
The comic takes place mainly during the 1930s and early 1940s and is set in Old Shanghai in its "golden era". Sanmao lived mostly in misery and stark poverty against a backdrop of war, colonization, and inflation.

Adaptations
The character made his first appearance in comics and was later adapted into different formats.

Further reading 
Farquhar, Mary Ann. "Sanmao: Classic Cartoons and Chinese Popular Culture" In Asian Popular Culture edited by John A. Lent (1995).
Cunningham, Maura. "Sanmao Saturday: Introducing Zhang Leping and His Sanmao the Orphan Comics", blog 30 Aug 2014.
Cunningham, Maura. "Sanmao Learns from Lei Feng", blog 5 March 2013.

Influence 
 The renowned Taiwanese writer Chen Mao Ping (1943–91) chose "San Mao" as her pen name out of her deep sympathy for the lonely, homeless boy.
 The Hong Kong movie star Sammo Hung Kam-Bo was given the name Sammo because of his supposed resemblance to Sanmao.

References

External links
"Sanmao, China's favorite son turns 70" - China Daily
Sanmao website
Official Sanmao website
Sammao comic strips, photos, movie clips and history AsiaObscura.com

Child characters in comics
Comics characters introduced in 1935
Fictional beggars
Fictional buskers
Fictional child soldiers
Fictional Han people
Fictional homeless people
Male characters in animated series
Male characters in comics
Manhua adapted into films
Manhua adapted into television series
Manhua titles
Orphan characters in comics